Dario Teso (born 27 December 1985) is an Italian football player who plays for Città di Caorle.

Club career
Born in Jesolo, Veneto, Teso started his career in Jesolo, On 14 August 2006, after a trial period, he joined Venezia. However, in winter 2007, he joined Bassano on loan.

On 15 January 2020 he joined Giana Erminio on loan until the end of the season.

On 1 February 2021, his contract with Renate was terminated by mutual consent.

On 11 February 2021, he joined Serie D club Lornano Badesse.

References

External links
 
 Dario Teso at Tuttocampo

1985 births
Sportspeople from the Metropolitan City of Venice
Living people
Italian footballers
Serie D players
Serie C players
Eccellenza players
Venezia F.C. players
Bassano Virtus 55 S.T. players
Tritium Calcio 1908 players
Carrarese Calcio players
A.C. Renate players
A.S. Giana Erminio players
Association football defenders
Footballers from Veneto
People from Jesolo